Roanoke City Market Historic District, also known as City Market District, is a national historic district located in the Downtown Roanoke area of Roanoke, Virginia.

A recent article about the city market said: "It’s been 135 years since Roanoke’s downtown farmers market, a city symbol, opened with 25 hucksters, otherwise known as vendors. In the market’s early days, including this view from 1936, there were more meat vendors compared with today’s seller mix... Today’s market includes an approximately 60 percent farmer mix, alongside crafters and others vendors. Martin Farms of Fincastle is the oldest continuous market vendor. It has been on the market since 1904."

It was listed on the National Register of Historic Places in 1983, with an area "Roughly bounded by Williamson Rd., Norfolk Ave., S. Jefferson St., and Church Ave.  The district area was increased to include 302 Campbell Ave., SE, and 9 Church Ave, SE, in 2002.  The district encompasses 51 contributing buildings and 1 contributing object.  The focal point of the area's grid-plan is the City Market Building (1922) set in the middle of the central Market Square. Other notable buildings include the Lampros Building (1909), the McGuire Building (1914), Goria Brothers Grocery Building (1924), and the E & M Market (1946). Located in the district is the separately listed Fire Station No. 1.

Gallery

References

External links 
City Market Building, Market Street & Campbell Avenue, Roanoke, Roanoke City, VA: 1 photo and 1 photo caption page at Historic American Buildings Survey

Historic American Buildings Survey in Virginia
Historic districts on the National Register of Historic Places in Virginia
National Register of Historic Places in Roanoke, Virginia
Buildings and structures in Roanoke, Virginia
Victorian architecture in Virginia